The Communist Party of Macedonia, also as League of Communists of Macedonia – Freedom Movement, is a communist party in North Macedonia. The party was de-registered due to low membership in 2007, but remains active and participates in the International Meeting of Communist and Workers' Parties. In 2015, it was one of three principal creators, along with the Movement for Social Justice "Lenka" and members of the Left Movement "Solidarity", of the new political party Levica. Levica won 2 seats in the 2020 North Macedonian parliamentary election.

References

Communist parties in North Macedonia
Political parties established in 1992
International Meeting of Communist and Workers Parties